The Iranian ambassador in Tashkent is the official representative of the Government in Tehran to the Government of Uzbekistan.

List of representatives

See also
Uzbekistan–Iran relations

References 

 
Uzbekistan
Iran